The Carlile Shale is a Turonian age Upper/Late Cretaceous series shale geologic formation in the central-western United States, including in the Great Plains region of Colorado, Kansas, Nebraska, New Mexico, North Dakota, South Dakota, and Wyoming.

Description 
The formation is composed of marine deposits of the generally retreating phase (hemi-cycle) of the Greenhorn cycle of the Western Interior Seaway, which followed the advancing phase of the same cycle that formed the underlying Graneros Shale and Greenhorn Formation. As such, the lithology progresses from open ocean chalky shale (with thin limestones) to increasing carbonaceous shale to near-shore sandstone. The contact between the Carlile Shale and the overlying Niobrara Formation is marked by an unconformity in much of the outcrop area, but where an unconformity is not discernible, the boundary is typically placed at the first resistant, fine-grained limestone bed at the base of the Niobrara Formation.

Fossil content  
Upper Turonian series plesiosaur remains are among the fossils that have been recovered from the strata of its Blue Hill Shale Member in Kansas. The Carlile in eastern South Dakota contains shark teeth, fossil wood and leaves, and ammonites.

Reptiles

Crocodyliforms

Plesiosaurs

Squamates

Fish

Cartilaginous fish

History of investigation
He described it as a medium gray shale, capped with limestone or sandstone, and assigned it to the Benton Group. By 1931, William Walden Rubey and his coinvestigators had mapped it into Kansas and the Black Hills. Rubey also first assigned it to the Colorado Group. C.H. Dane assigned it to the Mancos Shale in New Mexico in 1948.

Gallery

See also
 Volcanic mineralization of the Greenhorn cycle:
 Bentonite, sedimentary volcanic ash (named for the original Graneros/Greenhorn/Carlile classification), generally showing some weathered iron stain in the Colorado Group
 Pyrite, precipitation of volcanic sulfuric acid with oceanic iron as FeS2
 Limonite, pyrite in limestone weathered to HFeO2 (rust stain or yellow ochre)
 Selenite, CaSO4 associated with Bentonite seams and ochre

 Plesiosaur stratigraphic distribution

References

Shale formations of the United States
Turonian Stage
Cretaceous Colorado
Cretaceous Kansas
Cretaceous Nebraska
Cretaceous formations of New Mexico
Cretaceous geology of North Dakota
Cretaceous geology of South Dakota
Cretaceous geology of Wyoming
Upper Cretaceous Series of North America
Geologic formations of Colorado
Geologic formations of Kansas
Geologic formations of Nebraska
Geologic formations of North Dakota
Geologic formations of South Dakota
Geologic formations of Wyoming